The 1913-14 season in Swedish football, starting August 1913 and ending July 1914:

Honours

Official titles

Competitions

Promotions, relegations and qualifications

Promotions

League transfers

Relegations

Domestic results

Svenska Serien 1913–14

Uppsvenska Serien 1913–14

Mellansvenska Serien 1913–14

Centralserien 1913

Svenska Mästerskapet 1913 
Final

Corinthian Bowl 1913 
Final

Kamratmästerskapen 1913 
Final

Extra final

Wicanderska Välgörenhetsskölden 1913 
Final

National team results 

 Sweden: 

 Sweden: 

 Sweden: 

 Sweden: 

 Sweden: 

 Sweden: 

 Sweden:

National team players in season 1913/14

Notes

References 
Print

Online

 
Seasons in Swedish football